"Closer" is a song performed by American contemporary worship collective Maverick City Music featuring Brandon Lake. It was released as the closing track on their second live album, Maverick City, Vol. 3 Pt. 2, on October 9, 2020. The song was written by Brandon Lake, and Lake had released the original version of the song on his debut studio album, Closer (2016). Jonathan Jay and Tony Brown produced the song.

"Closer" peaked at No. 45 on the US Hot Christian Songs chart.

Background
Maverick City Music released their second live album, Maverick City, Vol. 3 Pt. 2 on October 9, 2020, with the song "Closer" featuring Brandon Lake as the closing track on the record. Jonathan Jay shared the breakdown of the song with Apple Music, saying: "It says, 'I need your love like I need water. I need your love like I need breath inside of my lungs.' It's a song of desperation: 'Lord, who are we without you?' It's just a song of dependence. We need that perspective and that reminder often, and it's so apropos for today."

The music video of the song was released on January 8, 2021.

Composition

Commercial performance
Following the release of the music video, "Closer" debuted at No. 45 on the US Hot Christian Songs chart dated January 23, 2021. It spent a total of three non-consecutive weeks on the Hot Christian Songs Chart.

Music video
Tribl released the official music video of "Closer" by Maverick City Music featuring Brandon Lake leading the song at 1971 Sounds in Atlanta, Georgia, through their YouTube channel on January 8, 2021.

Charts

References

External links
 

2020 songs
Maverick City Music songs
Brandon Lake songs
Songs written by Brandon Lake